Dedicated to the One I Love is an album of rock classics reinterpreted as children's lullabies by American singer, songwriter and producer Linda Ronstadt.

Released in mid-1996, it reached No. 78 and lasted three months on the main Billboard album chart. It also earned the singer a new career distinction when it hit #1 on the Top Kid Audio chart. It was awarded a 1997 Grammy Award.

The album includes vocal contributions from long-time collaborators Aaron Neville who duets on Brahms' Lullaby and Valerie Carter who provides harmony vocals on most tracks.

This album was reissued on Rhino's Flashback Records label in 2009. It is now out of print.

Critical reception

AllMusic critic Stephen Thomas Erlewine wrote: "All of the songs are given lush, sweet, and soft arrangements, even when that approach is ludicrous; it might be a cute idea to deliver Queen's 'We Will Rock You' as a rock-a-bye chant, but in practice it is simply ridiculous… the appeal of Dedicated to the One I Love is limited..."

Track listing

Personnel 
 Linda Ronstadt – lead vocals (1-5, 7-11), harmony vocals (1, 2, 3, 5, 8), string arrangements (1, 5, 7), arrangements (8, 10), backing vocals (9)
 Robbie Buchanan – synthesizers (3, 9), synthesizer voices (8), acoustic piano (9)
 Jim Cox – sampled harp (1-4, 6, 7, 10, 11), acoustic piano (5)
 Michelle Sell – harp (1, 3, 5)
 Dennis James – glass harmonica (2, 3, 5, 7-10)
 Larry Corbett – cello (1, 2, 3, 5)
 Rebecca Sebring – viola (1, 2, 3, 5)
 Jeremy Cohen – violin (1, 2, 3, 5)
 Dawn Dover – violin (1 2, 3, 5)
 Joseph Edelberg – violin (1, 2, 3, 5)
 Nathan Rubin – violin (1, 2, 3, 5)
 James Shallenberger – violin (1, 2, 3, 5)
 Margie Butler (of Golden Bough) – Celtic harp (6)
 Janet Ketchum – alto flute (7)
 Angela Koregelos – flute (7)
 Deborah Henry – English horn (7), oboe (7)
 David Campbell – string arrangements (1, 3, 5, 7, 11), conductor (1, 2, 3, 5, 10, 11), arrangements (10)
 Valerie Carter – harmony vocals (1, 2, 5, 8), lead vocals (4), backing vocals (9)
 Aaron Neville – lead vocals (10)

The Skywalker Symphony Orchestra
 David Schoenbrun – bass
 Stephen Tramontozzi – bass
 Larry Corbett – cello (principle)
 Jennifer Culp – cello
 Nina Flyer – cello
 Lawrence Granger – cello
 Eileen Moon – cello 
 Janet Witharm – cello
 Janet Ketchum – alto flute, flute
 Angela Koregelos – alto flute, flute
 Deborah Henry – English horn, oboe
 Susan Bates – viola
 Don Ehrlich – viola
 Ruth Freeman – viola (principle)
 Pam Freund – viola
 James Hurley – viola
 Betsy London – viola
 Rebecca Sebring – viola
 Nanci Severance – viola
 Jenny Bifano – violin
 Paul Brancato – violin
 Jeremy Cohen – violin, concertmaster 
 Jeremy Constant – violin
 Dawn Dover – violin
 Adrienne Duckworth – violin 
 Joseph Edelberg – violin 
 Ronald Erickson – violin
 Doris Fukawa – violin
 Darlene Gray – violin
 Byung Kim – violin
 Mia Kim – violin
 Virginia Price-Kvistad – violin
 Nathan Rubin – violin 
 James Shallenberger – violin 
 Dan Smiley – violin
 Mariko Smiley – violin
 Nadya Tichman – violin

Production 
 George Massenburg – producer, engineer, mixing 
 Linda Ronstadt – producer, liner notes
 Kevin Scott – mix assistant
 John Allair – piano technician 
 Doug Sax – mastering at The Mastering Lab (Hollywood, California).
 John Kosh – art direction, design, front cover photography
 Danny Ferrington – artwork, back cover photography, interior photography
 Rosie Santos – artwork, back cover photography, interior photography 
 Robert Blakeman – photography (of Linda Ronstadt)
 Marlene McLoughlin – angel illustration 
 Gail Rosman – production coordinator 
 Greg Sudmeier – orchestra coordinator 
 John Brenes – production archivist

References 

1996 albums
Elektra Records albums
Linda Ronstadt albums
Albums arranged by David Campbell (composer)
Albums produced by George Massenburg
Grammy Award for Best Musical Album for Children
Children's music albums by American artists